The  Tree Flag (or the Appeal to Heaven Flag) was one of the flags used during the American Revolution.  The flag, which featured a pine tree with the motto "An Appeal to Heaven," or less frequently "An Appeal to God", was originally used by a squadron of six frigates which were commissioned under George Washington's authority as Commander-in-chief of the Continental Army in October 1775.

It is the official maritime ensign for the Commonwealth of Massachusetts, though the script was removed in 1971. It was used by state navy vessels in addition to privateers sailing from Massachusetts.

Design

The design of the flag came from General Washington's secretary, Colonel  Joseph Reed. In a letter dated October 21, 1775, Reed suggested a "flag with a white ground and a tree in the middle, the motto AN APPEAL TO HEAVEN" be used for the ships Washington commissioned.

The following summer, on July 26, 1776, the Massachusetts General Court established the flag of the state navy with a resolution that stated in part: "...that the Colours be a white Flag, with a green Pine Tree, and an Inscription, 'Appeal to Heaven'."

Pine tree symbolism
The pine tree has been symbolic in New England since the late 16th century, predating the arrival of colonists. After warring for decades, leaders of five nations — the Seneca, Cayuga, Onondaga, Oneida, and Mohawk — buried their weapons beneath a tree planted by the Iroquois Confederacy founder, the Great Peacemaker, at Onondaga. The "tree of peace" is featured in the center of the Hiawatha Belt, the Iroquois national belt, named for the Great Peacemaker's helper, Hiawatha.

Colonists adopted the pine as a symbol on flags and currency in the 17th century, including variants of the flag of New England and coinage produced by the Massachusetts Bay Colony from 1652 to 1682. Leading up to the Revolutionary War, the pine tree became a symbol of colonial ire and resistance as well as multi-tribal support of independence.

New England's eastern white pine was prized in the colonial shipbuilding industry for its quality and height. Following their 1620 arrival to Plymouth, the Pilgrims began harvesting the indigenous pines; two decades later, they began exporting the wood as far as Madagascar.

Lacking domestic production of timber, and with imports from Russia and Sweden vulnerable to disruption, England included a mast-preservation clause in the 1691 Massachusetts Charter to ensure a reliable supply of 24-inch (61 cm) diameter trees for the Royal Navy. Surveyors marked trees appropriated to the Crown with the broad arrow symbol, but the so-called broad-arrow policy was never effectively enforced and colonists cut mast pines for sale on the black market.

In the Province of New Hampshire, enforcement led to the Pine Tree Riot in 1772, where a statute had been in effect since 1722 protecting 12-inch diameter trees. After being fined and refusing to pay for possessing trees marked with the broad arrow, a New Hampshire mill owner leading other mill owners and townsmen assaulted the sheriff and his deputy sent to arrest him by giving him one lash with a tree switch for every tree which the mill owners were fined, cutting the ears, manes, and tails off their horses, and forced them out of town through a jeering crowd. This was one of the first acts of forceful protest against British policies. It occurred almost two years prior to the more well-known Boston Tea Party protest and three years before open hostilities began at the Battles of Lexington and Concord.

According to legend, months prior to Colonel Joseph Reed's suggestion for using the pine, the pine was used on the flag that the colonists flew at the Battle of Bunker Hill in June 1775, though this is disputed by modern scholars. The historically accepted flag has a red field with the green pine tree in the upper left corner as depicted in John Trumbull's The Death of General Warren at the Battle of Bunker's Hill, June 17, 1775 painting. Provided Reed was aware of the Bunker Hill flag, there was a precedent to incorporate the pine in another Colonial martial flag.

Given the pine tree's significance to the colonists and since the flag was to fly over colonial warships, the pine offered an appropriate and ironic symbol, as it flew atop the very structure for which the British had sought to harvest the white pine.

The flag of Maine, the "pine tree state", featured a pine tree on a buff field with a blue star in the canton from 1901 to 1909.

Appeal To Heaven
The phrase is a particular expression of the right of revolution used by British philosopher John Locke in chapter 14 of his Second Treatise on Civil Government which was published in 1690 as part of Two Treatises of Government refuting the theory of the divine right of kings.

Locke's works were well-known and frequently quoted by colonial leaders, being the most quoted authority on the government in the 1760–1776 period prior to American independence. Locke’s specific writing that most influenced the American philosophy of government was his Two Treatises of Government. In fact, Richard Henry Lee, a signer of the Declaration of Independence, saw the Declaration as being copied from that work. Locke was not only one of the most-cited political philosophers during the Founding Era, but the single most frequently-cited source in the years from 1760–1776 (the period leading up to the Declaration of Independence).

Prior to Colonel Reed's suggestion and Massachusetts General Court establishing the Pine Tree flag as the standard of the Massachusetts navy, "an appeal to Heaven" or similar expressions had been invoked by the Massachusetts Provincial Congress in several resolutions, Patrick Henry in his Liberty or Death speech, and the Second Continental Congress in the Declaration of the Causes and Necessity of Taking Up Arms. Subsequently, it was used again by the Second Continental Congress in the Declaration of Independence.

Modern usage

The flag was prominently displayed in the introduction credits to HBO's John Adams miniseries (2008), referring to John Adams' proud, staunch New England identity.

In the 2010s, the flag became appropriated as a religious and political symbol by some conservative and nationalist activists within the United States.

In 2013, the flag was seen at a Million Vet March where it flew behind Sarah Palin in photographs. At the time, commentator Andrew Sullivan discussed the relevance of the flag's appearance, focusing on the connections between the historical message of the flag and its modern usage by political conservatives. In 2015, the Freedom From Religion Foundation demanded the flag's removal from a county courthouse in Arkansas. Also in 2015, the Appeal to Heaven flag and slogan were adopted by a conservative religious movement using the same name. In 2019, Illinois State Representative Chris Miller made a public appearance with the flag to "help focus attention" on a National Day of Prayer. The flag was also flown by Trump supporters and rioters during the 2021 United States Capitol attack.

See also
Flag of New England
1901 Maine Flag
American Enlightenment
Thompson's War
Pine Tree Riot

References

External links

History of An Appeal to Heaven flag, Wallbuilders
Dutch Sheets Tells Story Behind the Appeal to Heaven Flag

Pine Tree Flag